Mehmet Hetemaj (born 8 December 1987), is a Finnish defensive midfielder of Kosovar Albanian descent who plays for Finnish Veikkausliiga side SJK. He has represented both Finland national team and Kosovo national football team, but now he is no longer eligible to play for the latter. He started his football career in HJK youth team.

Club career

HJK Helsinki
Hetemaj started his career in Finland in HJK Helsinki where he made 17 appearances between 2006 and 2007. During 2007 season he was loaned to Viikingit for 9 matches.

Panionios
In 2008, he agreed a move to Greek club Panionios F.C. In June 2009 he was loaned out to Serie B outfit AlbinoLeffe, where he established himself as a regular.

AlbinoLeffe
In June 2010 AlbinoLeffe announced to have completed a bid to sign the player on a permanent basis from Panionios. He signed a four-year contract. In July 2012 he was loaned out to Serie B outfit Reggina Calcio. The loan contract with Reggina ended after the 2012–13 season and Hetemaj returned to AlbinoLeffe. In January 2014 it was announced that Hetemaj had signed a loan contract with a Finnish Premier League team Honka.

Monza
In July 2014 he joined Italian club Monza.

SJK
Hetemaj joined SJK in January 2015. Since then he has become a fan favorite and scored many important goals for the club. Hetemaj has been the clubs captain since 2019.

International career

Finland Under-21
Hetemaj, along with his older brother Përparim Hetemaj, was called up to represent Finland U-21 at the 2009 UEFA European Under-21 Football Championship.

Finland
Hetemaj made his senior debut for Finland against Japan in February 2009. After a convincing season in AlbinoLeffe he was called up again on 21 May 2010 for a match against Estonia.

Kosovo
Hetemaj made his senior debut for Kosovo in a 6–1 loss against Turkey in May 2014, a friendly match. However, he lost his eligible to switch for Kosovo in competitive match after accepting the call-up from Finland in 2016, after Kosovo became a member of UEFA and FIFA.

Personal life
Of Kosovar Albanian descent, Hetemaj was born in Skenderaj, Socialist Federal Republic of Yugoslavia, and moved to Finland in 1992. His family first arrived at Oulu but they moved to Helsinki, looking for a milder climate, due to his father, Miftar, having asthma. He has an older brother, the footballer Përparim, and two sisters, Fatlume and Fatbardhe.

Career statistics

Club

International

International goals
Scores and results list Finland's goal tally first.

Honours

Club
HJK Helsinki
Finnish Cup: 2006

References

External links
 Mehmet Hetemaj at U.C. AlbinoLeffe 
 
 
 
 Profile at Welt Fussball 

1987 births
Living people
Sportspeople from Skenderaj
Kosovan emigrants to Finland
Naturalized citizens of Finland
Association football midfielders
Finnish footballers
Finland international footballers
Finland under-21 international footballers
Kosovan footballers
Kosovo international footballers
Dual internationalists (football)
Helsingin Jalkapalloklubi players
FC Viikingit players
Panionios F.C. players
Thrasyvoulos F.C. players
U.C. AlbinoLeffe players
Reggina 1914 players
FC Honka players
A.C. Monza players
Seinäjoen Jalkapallokerho players
Veikkausliiga players
Serie B players
Serie C players
Super League Greece players
Finnish expatriate footballers
Kosovan expatriate footballers
Expatriate footballers in Greece
Finnish expatriate sportspeople in Greece
Kosovan expatriate sportspeople in Greece
Finnish expatriate sportspeople in Italy
Kosovan expatriate sportspeople in Italy
Finnish people of Albanian descent